A small but intense tornado outbreak occurred predominantly over McPherson and Brown County, South Dakota on June 23, 2002. A supercell thunderstorm produced six tornadoes in 72 minutes within the two counties. Two of the tornadoes were rated F3 and F4 respectively, and caused considerable damage to several homes and farms. Two other tornadoes occurred in North Dakota during the same time. The outbreak in Brown County was documented by a group of storm chasers and was featured on an episode of The Weather Channel's Storm Stories.

Meteorological synopsis
The area hit by the outbreak was in a drought; in the past three months, the area had only received four inches of rain. On June 23, a triple point was set up across eastern South Dakota, setting the stage for a powerful supercell to form.

Confirmed tornadoes

See also
 List of North American tornadoes and tornado outbreaks
 2003 South Dakota tornado outbreak – Tornado outbreak that affected similar areas one year later

References

External Links
Brown County supercell research

Tornado outbreaks
Tornado 2002-06-23
Tornado 2002-06-23
Tornado 2002-06-23
Tornado 2002-06-23
Tornadoes in South Dakota
Tornadoes in North Dakota
Tornadoes of 2002
F4 tornadoes
Brown County, South Dakota
F4 tornadoes by date